Julie Mare Fernandez (born 20 April 1974 in Hampstead, London) is a British actress and model best known for her role as Brenda in the BBC comedy The Office.

Early life 
Fernandez was born with osteogenesis imperfecta and uses a wheelchair. She was a student at Treloar School in Hampshire. Her father is Argentinean and her mother is English.

At the age of 14, Fernandez appeared on the popular BBC television series Jim'll Fix It. In October 2012, following a series of sexual abuse allegations made against the series' late host Jimmy Savile, Fernandez claimed that Savile had touched her inappropriately during the recording.

Career 

Her acting career began in 1992 when she starred as Vanessa Lockhead in the short-lived BBC soap opera Eldorado. She went on to play Sean Maguire's girlfriend in BBC1 drama Dangerfield before landing the role of Brenda in The Office.

In 2004, Fernandez formed a television production company called The Wheelie Good Company and has spent the time since working on new programme ideas. The company was set up by Fernandez to improve the representation of disabled people in the media but no longer focus on disability-related material.

She appeared as a regular guest on the quiz show HeadJam.

Fernandez also runs an arts and craft small business in Cambridgeshire, Bee Crafty, specialising in patchwork and quilting.

Personal life 

Fernandez is married to Andrew Elliott. She and her husband are foster parents.

Fernandez is a disability rights activist in the United Kingdom and has supported campaigns for the Disability Rights Commission and Scope. She set up The Disability Foundation, a British pan-disability charity boasting one of the largest disability information databases in the UK. In January 2003, she co-hosted the opening ceremony for the European Year of People with Disabilities in Athens.

References

External links

Website of Julie Fernandez's craft shop

Living people
1974 births
20th-century English actresses
20th-century English women
21st-century English actresses
21st-century English women
Actresses from London
British actors of Latin American descent
English people of Argentine descent
English people with disabilities
English soap opera actresses
English television actresses
Television presenters with disabilities
People from Hampstead
People with osteogenesis imperfecta